Tanzila Kamalovna Narbaeva (born 24 July 1957) is an Uzbek politician who has served as Chairperson of the Senate of Uzbekistan since 2019. She previously served as the Deputy Prime Minister from 2016 to 2019, and was the Chairperson of the Women's Committee from 2016 to 2019. Before entering politics she worked as a teacher in Tashkent. She is married, and is the mother of two children.

Education
 2006-2007 – PhD in Pedagogy, Tashkent State University
 1975-1981 – MA and BA in Russian and Literature, Tashkent State University.
2020 – DSc. in Sociology, Academy of Public Administration under the President of the Republic of Uzbekistan

Career

 2019–present	–	Chairperson of the Senate of the Oliy Majlis of the Republic of Uzbekistan
 2016-2019	–	Deputy Prime Minister, Chairperson of the women’s committee of Uzbekistan
 2010-2016	–	Chairperson of the Federation of Trade Unions of Uzbekistan
 2008-2010	–	Chief officer of the Information and Analytical Department for Education, Health and Social Protection of the Cabinet of Ministers of the Republic of Uzbekistan
 2005-2008	–	Senior specialist of the Information and Analytical Department for Education, Health and Social Protection of the Cabinet of Ministers of the Republic of Uzbekistan
 1998-2005	–	Head of the Secretariat of the Deputy Prime Minister of the Republic of Uzbekistan (complex for social protection of family, motherhood and childhood)
 1997-1998	–	Assistant of the Deputy Prime Minister of the Republic of Uzbekistan (complex for social protection of family, motherhood and childhood)
 1995-1997	–	Head of the Secretariat of the office of Deputy Prime Minister of the Republic of Uzbekistan
 1993-1995	–	Head of the department of the Central Council of the People's Democratic party of Uzbekistan
 1991-1993	–	Secretary of the Sobir Rahimov district’s Council of the People's democratic party of Uzbekistan
 1988-1991	–	Specialist of the party committee of the Sobir Rahimov’s district in Tashkent
 1986-1988	–	Director of Tashkent city schoolchildren house
 1974-1986	–	Worked on leading positions in primary public education sector, studied at the Tashkent State University (1975-1981)

References

1960 births
Living people
Members of the Senate of Uzbekistan
National University of Uzbekistan alumni
People from Andijan Region
21st-century Uzbekistani politicians
21st-century Uzbekistani women politicians